Amath Ndiaye Diedhiou (born 16 July 1996), known as Amath Ndiaye or simply Amath, is a Senegalese professional footballer who plays as a winger for Spanish club RCD Mallorca.

Club career
Born in Pikine, Amath joined Atlético Madrid's youth setup in 2014, from Real Valladolid. He made his senior debut with the former's reserves on 5 September 2015, coming on as a substitute in a 0–0 Tercera División home draw against CDE Lugo Fuenlabrada.

On 15 November 2015, Amath scored his first senior goals, netting a double in a 3–0 home win against CD Móstoles URJC. The following 6 January, he scored a hat-trick in a 4–1 away routing at AD Parla.

On 28 August 2016, Amath was loaned to Segunda División club CD Tenerife, for one year. He made his professional debut on 3 September, replacing Álex García in a 3–1 away loss against Elche CF.

Amath scored his first professional goal on 12 October 2016, netting his team's only in a 3–1 Copa del Rey away loss against Real Valladolid. Late in the month, he scored a brace in a 3–2 home win against Rayo Vallecano.

Amath finished the season with 12 goals, being a key unit as the Canarians missed out promotion in the play-offs. On 10 August 2017, he was signed a five-year contract with La Liga side Getafe CF, who bought 50% of his federative rights.

Amath made his debut in the top division of Spanish football on 20 August 2017, starting in a 0–0 away draw against Athletic Bilbao. He scored his first goal in the category on 30 September, netting the first in a 2–1 loss at Deportivo de La Coruña.

In December 2018, Amath was ruled out for the remainder of the season after suffering a knee injury in a match against CD Leganés. On 5 October 2020, after featuring rarely, he was loaned to second division side RCD Mallorca for the 2020–21 campaign.

Amath helped the Bermellones to return to the top tier at first attempt by netting nine goals in 31 appearances, and signed a permanent four-year deal with the club on 30 June 2021.

Career statistics

Club

International

References

External links
Profile at the RCD Mallorca website

1996 births
Living people
People from Dakar Region
Senegalese footballers
Association football forwards
Senegal international footballers
La Liga players
Segunda División players
Tercera División players
Atlético Madrid B players
Atlético Madrid footballers
CD Tenerife players
Getafe CF footballers
RCD Mallorca players
Senegalese expatriate footballers
Senegalese expatriate sportspeople in Spain
Expatriate footballers in Spain